Șeica may refer to two communes in Sibiu County, Romania:

Șeica Mare
Șeica Mică